Hoang Doc Bui (born 11 May 1972) is a retired Vietnam-born, Swiss football midfielder.

References

1972 births
Living people
Vietnamese emigrants to Switzerland
Swiss men's footballers
Neuchâtel Xamax FCS players
FC Bulle players
SR Delémont players
FC Sion players
Association football midfielders
Swiss Super League players